John de Vries may refer to:

 John de Vries (racing driver) (born 1966), Australian racing driver
 John de Vries (designer), Dutch automobile designer